The Honda CBR250RR is a CBR series  twin-cylinder sport bike made by Astra Honda Motor, a subsidiary of Honda in Indonesia. It was unveiled in July 2016 in Jakarta. Production was started in November of the same year for the 2017 model year. It is the first CBR motorcycle to have a twin-cylinder engine on RR moniker. It is also the smallest Honda motorcycle to wear a CBR-RR badge. Previously, Honda also used the "CBR250RR" name for their four-cylinder sport bike sold between 1990 and 1996. The bike is officially sold in Indonesia, Japan, Hong Kong, Macau, Thailand, and Malaysia.

According to Honda, the CBR250RR has technologies derived from the RC213V MotoGP bike, including throttle-by-wire technology, three riding modes, and a more compact engine design than its competitors.

Concept model 
The basis for the CBR250RR was Honda's Light Weight Super Sports Concept that was shown at the 2015 Tokyo Motor Show. The concept bike had a parallel-twin engine that redlined at 14,000 rpm. Honda said that, "attention to detail in functional components give the Light Weight Super Sports Concept a quality beyond its class, indicating the design direction of Honda's next generation lightweight super sports models."

2020 update 

The CBR250RR received its first update in July 2020, which included assist and slipper clutch as standard equipment. The engine is revamped within the internal parts. The compression ratio is increased by changing the piston shape, using smaller diameter balancer shaft to further increase maximum engine rotation speed in order to minimize friction loss, optimization of valve spring load, thorough reduction of friction by adding a notch at the lower end of cylinder to reduce pumping loss in the engine, addition of tin plating to the piston ring groove, adoption of high strength carburized connecting rod, optimization of the ignition timing, intake system parts, and changes to the internal structure of the muffler. The riding mode is also optimized to each parameter setting value. The friction of the front inverted fork is reduced and the damping force is optimized to improve handling. The quickshifter became available as an option, except for Indonesian SP model where it became standard.

2022 update 
The CBR250RR received its second update in September 2022.

Racing 
, the CBR250RR has participated in Asia Road Racing Championship at Asia Production 250cc (AP250) class. It won the championship in its debut season as well as the following year. The CBR250RR has also been raced in the Indonesian Indospeed Race Series championship.

Performance 
Some performance tests listed here were conducted by Otomotif tabloid from Indonesia in December 2016.

References

External links 

  (Japan)
  (Indonesia)

CBR250RR
Sport bikes
Motorcycles introduced in 2016
Motorcycles powered by straight-twin engines